Intermission is the first live album released by the American heavy metal band Dio in 1986 on the label Vertigo Records in Europe and Warner Bros. Records in North America. The live songs were recorded with guitarist Vivian Campbell during the first leg of the Sacred Heart tour. Craig Goldy replaced Campbell in mid-tour, and the band wanted something to represent the new line-up, so they recorded the song "Time to Burn" in the studio with him, which was added to this album.

The band was featured on many radio-broadcasts but fans who had hoped for a double live album were somewhat disappointed with this release, especially as the guitar parts of the now-departed Campbell seemed low in the mix.

The original UK release came with a postcard-pack.

In 2012, the album was included as bonus tracks on the deluxe edition of Sacred Heart.

Track listing

Personnel 
Dio
Ronnie James Dio – vocals
Vivian Campbell – guitar solos
Craig Goldy – guitar on "Time to Burn", over-dubbed rhythm guitar on the live tracks
Jimmy Bain – bass
Claude Schnell – keyboards
Vinny Appice – drums

Charts

References

External links 
Intermission at Black Sabbath Online

Dio (band) albums
1986 live albums
Warner Records live albums
Vertigo Records live albums